These are the official results of the Men's 10,000 metres event at the 1984 Summer Olympics in Los Angeles, California. There were a total number of 41 participating athletes. The event took place between 3 and 6 August.

Medalists

Abbreviations

Records
These were the standing world and Olympic records (in minutes) prior to the 1984 Summer Olympics.

Final
For the first 5,400 metres, this 10,000-metre final was run at a mostly slow and tactical pace.  Tanzania's Zakariah Barie led at 1,000 metres in about 2:53.0.  Sudan's Musa Jouda led the 18-man field through 2,000 metres (5:47.7), 3,000 metres (about 8:39), and 4,000 metres (11:32.51).  Then Ireland's John Treacy took over, running the fifth kilometre about five seconds faster than the fourth kilometre.  He passed 5,000 metres in 14:19.83.  Over 100 metres later, Portugal's talented but nervously fragile Fernando Mamede dropped out.  After 5,400 metres, Britain's Nick Rose suddenly surged past Treacy, accelerating into a 10-metre lead in a matter of seconds.  On the next home straight, Italy's Alberto Cova and Finland's Martti Vainio began to pursue Rose.  They caught and passed this British veteran runner after 5,700 metres, and quickly left him behind.  Vainio led Cova through 6,000 metres (17:00.25), 7,000 metres (19:41.1), 8,000 metres (22:25.0), and 9,000 metres (25:11.0).  Although he surged after 9,000 metres, he was unable to drop Cova from contention.  At 9,600 metres, Vainio's informal time was 26:48.64.  On the final bend, Cova easily sprinted past the tall Finn, who could no longer accelerate his pace.  Despite slowing down in the last metres, Cova defeated Vainio by 3.56 seconds, clocking 27:47.54.  Britain's Michael McLeod took the original bronze medal with an impressive final kick, crossing the finish line in 28:06.22.  Kenya's Mike Musyoki narrowly beat Italy's Salvatore Antibo.  West Germany's Christoph Herle and Kenya's Sosthenes Bitok had to settle for the chasing group's minor places.  Ironically, Bitok defeated the next runner, Japan's Yutaka Kanai, by 18 seconds, while only 7.5 seconds separated Kanai from the second-last runner, the United States' Pat Porter.  The last runner to complete the race, Japan's Masanari Shintaku, finished over 20 seconds behind Porter.  (YouTube - tommytempo1 (up to three videos on the race);  an Italian-language video on the last 500 metres of the race (Grandi vittori)) - YouTube;  The Big Olympic Book / Suuri olympiakirja, Helsinki, Finland, 1984 (Juoksija-lehti / The Runner Magazine);  The Big Olympic Work / Suuri olympiateos, Helsinki, Finland, 1984.)

Martti Vainio was disqualified after testing positive for performance-enhancing drugs.

Heats

See also
 1980 Men's Olympic Games 10,000 metres (Moscow)
 1982 Men's European Championships 10,000 metres (Athens)
 1983 Men's World Championships 10,000 metres (Helsinki)
 1984 Men's Friendship Games 10,000 metres (Moscow)
 1986 Men's European Championships 10,000 metres (Stuttgart)
 1987 Men's World Championships 10,000 metres (Rome)
 1988 Men's Olympic Games 10,000 metres (Seoul)

References

External links
 Results
 Results

 
10,000 metres at the Olympics
Men's events at the 1984 Summer Olympics